Joseph Haydn Potter (October 12, 1822 – December 1, 1892) was a career soldier from the state of New Hampshire who served as a general in the Union Army during the American Civil War. He was twice a prisoner of war and was cited for gallantry on multiple occasions.

Early life and career
Potter born in Concord, New Hampshire, on October 12, 1822. He was appointed to the United States Military Academy in 1839. He graduated in 1843, ranking just beneath classmate Ulysses S. Grant. For the next two years, as a second lieutenant, Potter was engaged in garrison duty. He participated in the military occupation of Texas and the Mexican War. He helped in the defense of Fort Brown and was wounded in the Battle of Monterey.

Subsequently he performed recruiting duty back in the East. Potter was promoted to first lieutenant in the 7th U.S. Infantry on October 30, 1847, and served on garrison duty until 1856, becoming a captain on January 9of that year. Potter accompanied the Utah expedition in 1858-60 and was subsequently sent back to Texas on outpost duty.

Civil War service
When war erupted in early 1861, Potter was still stationed in Texas. He was captured by Confederates at St. Augustine Springs on July 27, 1861, and was held as a prisoner of war for more than a year. He was finally exchanged on August 2, 1862. He returned to active duty and was assigned command of the 12th New Hampshire Infantry as a colonel in the volunteer Union Army while retaining his rank of captain in the Regular Army.

Potter took part in the Maryland Campaign with the Army of the Potomac and subsequently participated in the Rappahannock Campaign that led to the Battle of Fredericksburg. During the 1863 Battle of Chancellorsville, he was wounded and captured again. His services in these two battles earned him brevet ranks of lieutenant colonel and colonel respectively in the Regular Army. While still a prisoner of war, he was also promoted to the full rank of major in the regular army on July 4, 1863.

He was exchanged in October 1863, and was then the assistant provost marshal general of Ohio until September 1864, when he was assigned a brigade in the XVIII Corps of the Army of the James. He commanded the Bermuda Hundred front during the attack on Fort Harrison.

Afterward, Potter assumed command of a brigade in the XXIV Corps and led it during the Siege of Petersburg. He continued at the front as chief of staff of the XXIV Corps from January 1865, until the surrender of General Robert E. Lee. He received the brevet of brigadier general in the United States Army on March 13, 1865, and promotion to brigadier general of volunteers on May 1, 1865.

Postbellum career
Potter was mustered out of the volunteer service on January 15, 1866, and appointed as the lieutenant colonel of the 30th Infantry Regiment on July 28 that same year. After holding various posts in the West, he was promoted to the full rank of colonel on December 11, 1873, commanding the 24th Infantry Regiment .

From July 1, 1877, to July 1, 1881, Potter was the governor of the soldiers' home in Washington, D. C. He then returned to his regiment. On April 1, 1886, he was made brigadier general in the Regular Army. He then had command of the Department of the Missouri until his retirement on October 12, 1886.

Potter was a member of both the Aztec Club of 1847 and the Military Order of the Loyal Legion of the United States.

Potter retired to Columbus, Ohio, where he died in 1892. He is buried in Green Lawn Cemetery.

In 1903 Battery Potter at Fort Hancock, New Jersey was named for him.

See also

List of American Civil War generals (Union)

Notes

References
 U.S. War Department, The War of the Rebellion: a Compilation of the Official Records of the Union and Confederate Armies, U.S. Government Printing Office, 1880–1901.
Attribution

Union Army generals
United States Military Academy alumni
People of New Hampshire in the American Civil War
American Civil War prisoners of war
American military personnel of the Mexican–American War
Members of the Aztec Club of 1847
People from Concord, New Hampshire
Burials at Green Lawn Cemetery (Columbus, Ohio)
1822 births
1892 deaths